Jaan-Johann Bergmann (31 January 1867 Elistvere Parish (now Tartu Parish), Kreis Dorpat – 30 September 1938 Tallinn) was an Estonian politician. He was a member of I Riigikogu, and from 4 January 1921 to 30 May 1923 was its First Assistant Secretary.

References

1867 births
1938 deaths
People from Tartu Parish
People from Kreis Dorpat
Christian People's Party (Estonia) politicians
Members of the Riigikogu, 1920–1923
Members of the Riigikogu, 1923–1926